Grading in civil engineering and landscape architectural construction is the work of ensuring a level base, or one with a specified slope, for a construction work such as a foundation, the base course for a road or a railway, or landscape and garden improvements, or surface drainage.  The earthworks created for such a purpose are often called the sub-grade or finished contouring  (see diagram).

Regrading 

Regrading is the process of grading for raising and/or lowering the levels of land. Such a project can also be referred to as a regrade.

Regrading may be done on a small scale (as in preparation of a house site) or on quite a large scale (as in major reconfiguration of the terrain of a city, such as the Denny Regrade in Seattle).

Regrading is typically performed to make land more level (flatter), in which case it is sometimes called levelling.) Levelling can have the consequence of making other nearby slopes steeper, and potentially unstable or prone to erosion.

Transportation
In the case of gravel roads and earthworks for certain purposes, grading forms not just the base but the cover and surface of the finished construction, and is often called finished grade.

Process

It is often done using heavy machinery like bulldozers and excavators to roughly prepare an area and then using a grader for a finer finish.

Environmental design
In the environmental design professions, grading and regrading are a specifications and construction component in landscape design, landscape architecture, and architecture projects. It is used for buildings or outdoor amenities regarding foundations and footings,  slope terracing and stabilizing, aesthetic contouring, and directing surface runoff drainage of stormwater and domestic/irrigation runoff flows.

Purposes
Reasons for regrading include:
 Enabling construction on lands that were previously too varied and/or steeply sloped.
 Enabling transportation along routes that were previously too varied and/or steep.
 Changing drainage patterns and rerouting surface flow.
 Improving the stability of terrain adjacent to developments.

Consequences
Potential problems and consequences from regrading include:
 Soil and/or slope instability
 Terrain prone to erosion
 Ecological impacts, habitat destruction, terrestrial and/or aquatic biological losses.
 Drainage problems (surface and/or subsurface flow) for areas not considered in the regrading plan.
 Loss of aesthetic natural landscape topography and/or historical cultural landscapes.

See also 

 Cut (earthmoving)
 Cut-and-cover
 Cut and fill
 Fill dirt
 Grade (slope) (civil engineering and geographical term)
 Regrading
 Slope (mathematical term)
 Subgrade
 Trench

References

External links 

 Matusik, John. "Grading and Earthworks" in The Land Development Handbook, 2004.
 Gravel Roads Construction and Maintenance Guide, Federal Highway Administration (FHWA) and the South Dakota Local Technical Assistance Program (SDLTAP), 2015.
 "How to Grade Gravel Roads" in Gravel Roads, Soil Stabilization, Soil-Sement® by Frank Elswick, 2017.
 Recommended  Practices Manual: A Guideline for Maintenance and Service of Unpaved Roads,  Choctawhatchee, Pea and Yellow Rivers Watershed Management Authority, 2000.

Construction
Artificial landforms
Gardening aids
Landscape architecture
Road construction